Mukhriddin Tilolov (born 1 July 1994) is a Uzbekistani judoka.

He is the bronze medallist of the 2021 Judo Grand Slam Tel Aviv in the -66 kg category.

References

External links
 
 

1994 births
Living people
Uzbekistani male judoka
20th-century Uzbekistani people
21st-century Uzbekistani people